The Swedish People's Party of Finland is a political party in Finland aiming to represent the interests of the minority Swedish-speaking population of Finland. The party is currently participating in the government of Sanna Marin, holding the positions of Minister of Justice and Minister for Nordic Cooperation and Equality.

An ethnic catch-all party, the party's main election issue has been since its inception the Swedish-speaking Finns' right to their own language and to maintain the position of the Swedish language in Finland. Ideologically, it is liberal and social-liberal, and it sits at the centre of the political spectrum, and identifies as pro-European. The party was in governmental position 1979–2015 and from 2019 on, with one or two seats in the government and collaborated with the centre-right as well as the centre-left parties in the Parliament of Finland.

The fact that both the Finnish centre-right and centre-left have needed the support from the party has meant that they have been able to affect politics of Finland on a larger scale than the party's actual size would suggest. The position of the Swedish language as one of two official languages in Finland and the Swedish-speaking minority's right to the Swedish culture are two of the results of the party's influence in Finnish politics. The party is a member of the Liberal International, the Alliance of Liberals and Democrats for Europe and Renew Europe. The youth organisation of the party is called Svensk Ungdom ("Swedish Youth").

History and electorate
 The Swedish Party (1870–1906), a parliamentary elite party based on members in the Diet of Finland, is the historical predecessor of the Swedish People's Party of Finland. It was a part of the Svecoman movement and its main policy was opposition of the Fennoman movement.

Unlike Fennomans who were largely liberal on other matters than the language question, the Svecoman were conservative. Axel Lille and Axel Olof Freudenthal are often considered as some of the main "founding fathers" of the movement. Most members of the Liberal Party joined the Swedish Party in the 1880s, after the Liberals ceased to exist as a distinct party. The Swedish People's Party of Finland was founded in the 1906 party congress of the Swedish Party, making it one of the oldest parties in Finland. The first leader of Swedish People's Party was Axel Lille.

The current leader of the party is Anna-Maja Henriksson. In the Parliament of Finland the representative for Åland is usually included in SFP's parliamentary group, regardless of his/her party affiliation. This is because the political parties in Åland have no counterparts in Mainland Finland, but the SFP's interests have much in common with those of Åland as far as the Swedish language is concerned.

The party receives its main electoral support from the Swedish speaking minority, which makes up about 5.5% of Finland's population. During its history, the party has suffered slow but steady decline in adherence, following the decline of the percentage of Swedish-speaking population: in 1907 it got 12% of national votes, after World War II 7% and in the 2011 parliamentary election 4.3% (9 MPs). In municipal elections, it holds large majorities in municipalities with a Swedish-speaking majority.

Despite its position as one of the minor political parties in the Finnish parliament it has frequently been one of the partners forming the governing coalition cabinets. Since 1956, the year when Urho Kekkonen was elected President, the party has been nearly continuously in the government. It has been part of all coalitions with the significant exception of Paasio's first cabinet (1966–68), which included only socialists (Social Democratic Party (SDP), the split SDP faction Social Democratic Union of Workers and Smallholders and Finnish People's Democratic League) and the Centre Party.

Short periods of rule by single-party minority governments, Miettunen cabinet (1961–62, Centre) and Paasio's second government (1972, SDP) and of nonpartisan caretaker governments have also interrupted its stay in the government. For this reason, SFP is often criticized for being a single-issue party that allegedly accepts nearly all other policies as long as its own vital interest, the status of the Swedish language is maintained.

However, although Vanhanen's first cabinet made Swedish a voluntary subject in the upper secondary school's matriculation exam, SFP remained in the government. In contrast, the Greens left the previous government after a new nuclear power plant was decided in 2002.

The SFP's long continuous participation in the Finnish cabinets came to an end in following the 2015 parliamentary election when it was left out of the Sipilä cabinet. In June 2019, the SFP returned to government with two ministerial positions in the Rinne Cabinet, the Minister of Justice and the Minister for Nordic Cooperation and Equality.

Recently the SFP has emphasized the liberal part of its programme, attempting to woo voters outside its traditional Swedish-speaking electorate. In 2010, the party added the word Suomen ("of Finland") to its official Finnish name.

Election results

Parliament of Finland

European Parliament

Presidential elections

Political positions

The Swedish language is one of the two official languages of Finland. The SFP has as its main raison d'être the protection and strengthening of the position of the Swedish language in Finland.

The Swedish People's Party of Finland has the most eclectic profile of any of the political parties in Finland, its members and supporters including (chiefly):
 fishermen and farmers from the Swedish-speaking coastal areas.
 small-town dwellers from the adjacent Swedish-speaking and bi-lingual towns.
 a significant part of the Swedish-speaking population of Finland
 left-leaning middle-class people.
 liberals in general, who currently have no representation of their own in the Finnish parliament, and who as such benefit from the predominantly liberal values of the SFP.

Although the SFP represents a small minority of Finland, Swedish mother tongue per se is not much of a political handicap. Several times Swedish speaking presidential candidates have gathered considerable support, although not necessarily as candidates for the Swedish People's Party of Finland:

 In 1944 the Swedish-Finnish Carl G. E. Mannerheim a hero of Finnish independence became Finlands 6th president.
 In 1956 the Swedish-speaking Social Democrat Karl-August Fagerholm got one elector's vote less than needed to be elected, and the Agrarian Urho Kekkonen was elected.
 In 1994 the SFP's candidate Elisabeth Rehn was defeated by the Social Democrat candidate Martti Ahtisaari, also with a narrow margin (53.9% to 46.1%).

SFP supports Finnish NATO membership and envisions that Finland could become a full NATO member by 2025.

List of party leaders

 Axel Lille (1906–1917)
 Eric von Rettig (1917–1934)
 Ernst von Born (1934–1945)
 Ralf Törngren (1945–1955)
 Ernst von Born (1955–1956)
 Lars Erik Taxell (1956–1966)
 Jan-Magnus Jansson (1966–1973)
 Kristian Gestrin (1973–1974)
 Carl Olof Tallgren (1974–1977)
 Pär Stenbäck (1977–1985)
 Christoffer Taxell (1985–1990)
 Ole Norrback (1990–1998)
 Jan-Erik Enestam (1998–2006)
 Stefan Wallin (2006–2012)
 Carl Haglund (2012–2016)
 Anna-Maja Henriksson (2016–)

See also

 Contributions to liberal theory
 Liberalism worldwide
 List of liberal parties
 Liberal democracy
 Liberalism and centrism in Finland
 Finland's language strife
 Swedish Assembly of Finland
 Svecoman
 Rolf Witting
 Axel Olof Freudenthal
 Swedish People's League in the Baltic Sea Provinces

References

External links

Website of the Swedish People's Party of Finland

Swedish People's Party of Finland
1906 establishments in the Russian Empire